The following are some alleged sightings of unidentified flying objects in Russia:
The Tunguska event of 1908, is considered to have been the explosion of a meteor, though some regard it as an explosion of a UFO.
The Petrozavodsk phenomenon on September 20, 1977.
The Voronezh UFO incident of 1989.
The Sasovo explosions were two mysterious explosions which occurred on April 12, 1990, and July 8, 1992, equivalent to 25 tons TNT.
Early in 2012 a crashed titanium object, described as a "UFO fragment", was retrieved from a forest in the vicinity of Otradnenskoye, a rural locality in Novosibirsk Oblast, after strange sounds were heard there in December 2011. The smooth, silvery and U-shaped device, attached to a rounded section, and was not deemed to be related to space technology.

See also 
 List of major UFO sightings

References

External links 
MUFON - Last 20 UFO Sightings and Pictures

Russia
Historical events in Russia